The Rijksmuseum Research Library is the largest public art history research library in the Netherlands. The library is part of the Rijksmuseum in Amsterdam. The profile of the library collection parallels that of the museum. The online catalogue contains over 400,000 monographs, 3,400 periodicals and 90,000 art sales catalogues. About 50,000 art sales catalogues published before 1989 are not yet entered in the online catalogue. The collection grows, on average, by 10,000 books, auction catalogues, and periodicals every year.

Visitors
After the renovation which started in 2004, the library transformed into a classical reading room, with information about the collections of the museum. An extensive  collection of reference books and journals is available in the reading room.

Since April 14, 2013 the library has been housed in the main Rijksmuseum building, Museumstraat 1, Amsterdam. The library is open Monday to Saturday, 10 AM until 5 PM, closed on Sundays and on public holidays.

See also
List of libraries in the Netherlands

References

External links

 Rijksmuseum Research Library, official website and catalogue
 OCLC video about the library and the Art Discovery Group Catalogue

Arts in the Netherlands
Libraries in Amsterdam
Research libraries in the Netherlands
Rijksmuseum Amsterdam
Libraries established in 1885
1885 establishments in the Netherlands
19th-century architecture in the Netherlands